M. J. Sullivan (born March 1, 1960) is an American author and sports writer living in New York City.

Biography
Sullivan graduated from St. John's University in 1983 and moved into sports journalism, hosting sports radio shows on WGBB on Long Island, NY, and WEVD 1050AM in New York City, as well as work with ESPN, Sporting News and Fox-owned Scout.com.

Sullivan has written a number of children sports books published by Enslow Publishers, including biographies on Shaquille O'Neal, Chris Mullin, Darryl Strawberry, Barry Bonds, and Mark Messier. He also published a book of trivia, So You Think You're A New Yorker.

In fall 2008, Sullivan's first novel, Necessary Heartbreak, from his When Time Forgets series, was published. Centered on a single dad in modern-day New York struggling to raise his feisty 13-year-old daughter, the story explores the concepts of faith and redemption.  When the main characters discover a portal leading back in time to first-century Jerusalem during the tumultuous last week of Christ’s life, they must encounter their present fears, such as a menacing soldier determined to prey upon the teenage girl, as well as their complicated and broken pasts.

Published works

When Time Forgets Series
 Necessary Heartbreak 
 A Timely Death  (September 2009)
 The Manger  (October 2010)

Trivia
 So You Think You're a New Yorker 

Children's Sports Biographies
 The New York Rangers Hockey Team (Great Sports Teams)
 Top 10 Baseball Pitchers
 Sports Great Shaquille O'Neal (Sports Great Books) 
 Mark Messier: Star Center (Sports Reports) 
 Sports Great Barry Bonds (Sports Great Books) 
 Chris Mullin: Star Forward (Sport Reports) 
 Sports Great Darryl Strawberry (Sports Great Books) 

Children's Action Series
 Ultimate Adventures New Digidestined, Vol. 2 

References

External links
Biography at Official Website

1960 births
Living people
American male writers
St. John's University (New York City) alumni
American sportswriters